Major General Sir Victor Morven Fortune  (21 August 1883 – 2 January 1949) was a senior officer of the British Army. He saw service in both World War I and World War II. He commanded the 51st (Highland) Infantry Division during the Battle of France and was subsequently trapped and obliged to surrender to the Germans on 12 June 1940.

Military career
After being educated at Winchester and the Royal Military College, Sandhurst, Fortune was commissioned as a second lieutenant in the British Army from 1903, joining the 1st Battalion, The Black Watch (Royal Highlanders).

On the outbreak of the First World War he had risen to the  rank of lieutenant and was serving as a platoon commander in A Company under Major Lord George Stewart-Murray. The battalion sailed to France in August 1914, where Fortune saw initial action during The Retreat from Mons and the First Battle of the Marne. In September 1914 he was promoted to captain, taking command of A Company following the death of Major Lord Stewart-Murray at the First Battle of the Aisne. Fortune led A Company ably through The First Battle of Ypres before moving up to battalion headquarters as adjutant on 11 November 1914, where he saw further action at Givenchy, Cuinchy, Neuve Chapelle and Aubers Ridge. 

He served as battalion adjutant until 30 September 1915, when he was appointed as brigade major to the 1st Infantry Brigade, serving in this key role during the costly Battle of Loos. Fortune returned to 1st Battalion The Black Watch (Royal Highlanders) almost exactly a year later on 16th September 1916 when, as acting lieutenant colonel, he was appointed commanding officer (CO) during the Battle of the Somme.  He led the battalion competently through final stages of the Battle of the Somme and the later Battle of Passchendaele before a transfer to command the Fourth Army Musketry School in January 1918. Fortune ended the war as commander of the 46th Brigade with the rank of acting brigadier general. During his wartime service Fortune was awarded the Distinguished Service Order and five times mentioned in dispatches.

After attending the Staff College, Camberley from 1920 to 1921, he returned to Sandhurst, this time as instructor.  Promoted major in January 1923, he was appointed assistant commandant, Small Arms School, Hythe, which was followed in 1925 by a brief return to  the 1st Battalion The Black Watch (Royal Highlanders) in India and then in 1927, having been promoted lieutenant colonel, he was appointed CO of the 1st Battalion, Seaforth Highlanders  and subsequently commander of the 5th Infantry Brigade in 1930. He became general officer commanding (GOC) of the 52nd (Lowland) Infantry Division in 1935 and GOC of the 51st (Highland) Infantry Division in 1937.

The 51st Division remained in France after the general evacuation from Dunkirk, having been assigned to the French IX Corps. After naval evacuation proved impossible and supplies of ammunition had been exhausted, Major-General Fortune was forced to surrender the greater part of the Highland Division at St Valery en Caux.

Fortune spent the rest of the war as a prisoner of war. As a senior British officer in captivity in Germany, he worked to improve the conditions of the men under his command. He suffered a stroke in 1944 but refused repatriation. He was finally liberated in April 1945 and made KBE shortly after.

Several British writers have questioned the decision to remain with the French during the battle. However, General Charles de Gaulle stated, 'For my part, I can say that the comradeship of arms, sealed on the battlefield of Abbeville in May–June 1940, between the French armoured division, which I had the honour to command, and the gallant 51st Scottish Division under General Fortune, played its part in the decision which I made to continue the fight at the side of the Allies, to the end, come what may'. And he concluded by quoting the old motto of the Garde Ecossaise: omni modo fidelis – faithful in every way.

References

Bibliography

External links
Recollections of Susan Fortune. Victor Fortune's daughter-in-law
British Army Officers 1939−1945
Generals of World War II

|-

1883 births
1949 deaths
Scottish military personnel
British Army major generals
British Army generals of World War I
British Army generals of World War II
Companions of the Distinguished Service Order
Companions of the Order of the Bath
Knights Commander of the Order of the British Empire
Officiers of the Légion d'honneur
Recipients of the Order of the Phoenix (Greece)
World War II prisoners of war held by Germany
Deputy Lieutenants of Perthshire
People from Castle Douglas
Black Watch officers
People educated at Winchester College
Graduates of the Staff College, Camberley
Academics of the Royal Military College, Sandhurst
Graduates of the Royal Military College, Sandhurst